Secrets of Eden is a 2012 suspense television film directed by Tawnia McKiernan, based on a book by Chris Bohjalian published in 2010. The film was set and recorded in Toronto, Canada.

Plot summary

Pastor Steven Drew's faith is shattered after one of his newly baptized members, Alice Hayward, is murdered by her abusive husband George, who then seems to commit suicide. The pastor meets an author/Detective Catherine Benincasa working on a book about angels who helps him face his demons, and the law. Evidence surfaces that there was an affair between Alice and Reverend Drew. Katie, the Haywards’ orphaned 15-year-old daughter, is the only key to uncover the disturbing secrets of what happened behind closed doors on that fateful night and the suffering they endured as a “not so perfect” family.

Cast
 John Stamos as Pastor Steven Drew
 Anna Gunn as Detective Catherine Benincasa
 Sonya Salomaa as Alice Hayward
 Samantha Munro as Kate Hayward
 Athena Karkanis as Heather
 Lisa Ryder as Ginny McBradden
 Graham Abbey as George Hayward
 John Bourgeois as Jim Halm
 J. P. Manoux as Detective Emmet Walker
 John Robinson as Paul Benincasa
 Neil Foster as David Dennison
 Barry Flatman as Aaron Lance
 Jordan Todosey as Tina McBradden

References

External links 
 
 
 

2012 television films
2012 films
American television films
Films based on American novels
2010s English-language films